Kožbana is a village in the Municipality of Brda in the Littoral region of Slovenia, close to the border with Italy.

The parish church in the settlement is dedicated to Saint George and belongs to the Koper Diocese.

References

External links
Kožbana on Geopedia

Populated places in the Municipality of Brda